"Starlight" is a song by British rapper Dave. It was released on 3 March 2022 through Dave and Neighbourhood Recordings. The song was written and produced by Dave himself. It debuted at number-one in both the UK Singles Chart and the Irish Singles Chart, becoming Dave's second number-one single in the UK, after "Funky Friday" in 2018, and his first in Ireland. It was nominated for Song of the Year at the 2023 Brit Awards.

Composition
A self-produced track, the song samples a rendition of Bart Howard's 1954 standard "Fly Me to the Moon", by Norwegian singer Angelina Jordan in 2017. Lyrics include references to the song itself, American rapper Meek Mill, Jamaica and his home South London. Having found his significant other, he describes his wish to settle down. He also flexes career highlights and changes in his life. The "subtle" and "wavy" song is built around a "hummed melody" and a "minimal beat" that puts "bars front and centre". The song was seen as separation from his usual sound, pivoting between "UK drill elements and something a little more trans-Atlantic".

Music video
The music video was released on 3 March 2022. It was directed by Nathan Tettey, alongside Dave himself. The video takes place at a luxurious apartment and shows Dave and Corteiz founder Clint wearing latest fits. On top, it features models walking down a runway, as well as Dave and some friends posing for mugshots.

Commercial performance
On 11 March 2022, "Starlight" entered the UK Singles Chart at number one. It also debuted at number 35 on the Official Singles Sales Chart Top 100.

Charts

Weekly charts

Year-end charts

Certifications

References

2022 singles
2022 songs
Dave (rapper) songs
Irish Singles Chart number-one singles
Songs written by Dave (rapper)
UK Singles Chart number-one singles